Manuel Alejandro Mayorga Almaráz (born 29 May 1997) is a Mexican professional footballer who plays as a left-back for Liga MX club Guadalajara.

Club career
Mayorga joined C.D. Guadalajara's youth academy in 2011. He made his Liga MX debut under manager Matías Almeyda on 5 August 2017 in a 2–2 draw against Club Necaxa.

Making three appearances and scoring one goal in the 2018 CONCACAF Champions League in which Guadalajara won,  he was included in the tournament's Best XI.

In June 2018, he joined Necaxa on loan for the 2018 Apertura.

In December 2019, he joined Club Universidad Nacional on loan for 2020. On 12 January 2020, he made his debut against C.F. Pachuca in a 2–1 win. On 30 August, he scored his first goal with the team against Club Tijuana in a 3–0 victory. Following an impressive Guardianes 2020 performance in which Pumas U.N.A.M. managed to reach the championship final, Mayorga returned to Guadalajara.

International career

Youth
Mayorga was called up by Marco Antonio Ruiz for the 2017 CONCACAF U-20 Championship. 
Mayorga started in all of the national team's matches in the 2017 FIFA U-20 World Cup in South Korea.

Mayorga participated at the 2020 CONCACAF Olympic Qualifying Championship, appearing in four matches, where Mexico won the competition.

Senior
Mayorga and Edson Álvarez were given the opportunity by Juan Carlos Osorio to be supporting practice squad players with the senior national team that participated at the 2017 Confederations Cup. At the conclusion of the tournament, he got his first call up to the senior national side in the preliminary list for the subsequent Gold Cup, all before his Liga MX debut. He eventually made it to the official 23-man list.

Career statistics

Club

Honours
Guadalajara
CONCACAF Champions League: 2018

Necaxa
Supercopa MX: 2018

Cruz Azul
Supercopa de la Liga MX: 2022

Mexico U23
CONCACAF Olympic Qualifying Championship: 2020

Individual
CONCACAF Champions League Best XI: 2018

References

External links
 
 

1997 births
Living people
Mexican footballers
Footballers from Durango
Mexico under-20 international footballers
Mexico youth international footballers
C.D. Guadalajara footballers
Club Necaxa footballers
Club Universidad Nacional footballers
Liga MX players
2017 CONCACAF Gold Cup players
Association football fullbacks